Luigi Montini (born 24 February 1934) is an Italian actor in over a hundred films and TV shows since 1962.

Selected filmography

External links 

1934 births
Living people
Italian male film actors